Albert Bennett may refer to:
Albert Arnold Bennett (1849–1909), American Baptist missionary and hymn composer
Sir Albert Bennett, 1st Baronet (1872–1945), British politician
Albert Bennett (cricketer) (1910–1985), English cricketer
Albert E. Bennett (1914–1971), American lawyer and politician
Albert Bennett (footballer) (1944–2016), English footballer

See also
Bennett (disambiguation)
Bert Bennett (Hubert Henry Bennett, 1889/90–1968), English footballer